West Side Story is a 1957 American musical.

West Side Story or Westside Story may also refer to:

Related to the musical 
 West Side Story (Original Broadway Cast), a 1957 recording
 West Side Story (1961 film), an adaptation directed by Robert Wise and Jerome Robbins
 West Side Story (1961 soundtrack)
 West Side Story, a novelization of the film by Irving Shulman
 West Side Story (2021 film), an adaptation directed by Steven Spielberg
 West Side Story (2021 soundtrack)
 West Side Story Suite, a 1995 ballet
 West Side Story (André Previn album) (1959)
 West Side Story (Cal Tjader album) (1962)
 West Side Story (Oscar Peterson Trio album) (1962)
 Kenton's West Side Story, a 1961 album by Stan Kenton
 West Side Story, a 1961 album by Ferrante & Teicher
 West Side Story (Earl Hines album)
 West Side Story, a 1985 album by the Philip Jones Brass Ensemble
 West Side Story: The Original Score, a 2002 album by the Nashville Symphony

Other uses 
 Westside Story (The Game album) (2004)
 "Westside Story" (song)
 Westside Story (5566 album)
 Westside Story (TV series), a Taiwanese idol drama starring 5566

See also
 East Side Story (disambiguation)
 Southside Story (disambiguation)
 "Upper West Side Story", an episode of "White Collar"
 West Side Stories, a 1994 Jeff Lorber album